Štefan Gerec (born 10 November 1992) is a Slovak professional footballer who currently plays for Ružomberok.

Club

MFK Ružomberok
He made his debut for Ružomberok against Dukla Banská Bystrica on 28 July 2012, in a 1–0 win. In the 86th minute Gerec came on to the pitch, replacing Štefan Pekár, who scored the game's only goal, in the 60th minute. Before the end of the season, Gerec came on as a substitute two more times against Slovan Bratislava and Senica.

External links
MFK Ružomberok profile

References

1992 births
Living people
People from Ružomberok District
Sportspeople from the Žilina Region
Slovak footballers
Slovakia youth international footballers
Association football forwards
MFK Ružomberok players
FC DAC 1904 Dunajská Streda players
FK Železiarne Podbrezová players
MFK Tatran Liptovský Mikuláš players
Slovak Super Liga players
2. Liga (Slovakia) players